The Beenleigh railway line is a suburban railway line extending  east-southeast from Brisbane Central railway station, the state capital of Queensland, Australia.  It is part of the Queensland Rail City network.

History

Originally known as the Logan railway line, the line opened to Loganlea in April 1885 being the first section of the South Coast line which was opened beyond Beenleigh to Southport in 1889.

The original city terminus of the line was Stanley St, South Brisbane until a dual track line was constructed from Dutton Park to South Brisbane opposite the Victoria Bridge opening in 1891.

The railway originally approximately paralleled Fairfield Road between Dutton Park and Yeronga. Following the 1893 Brisbane flood, the Fairfield Deviation realigned the route above the flood level onto the current alignment. The line from Dutton Park to Yeerongpilly was duplicated at the same time.

The standard gauge line from Sydney, NSW which opened in 1930 was built parallel to the line from Salisbury to South Brisbane.

The section from Yeerongpilly to Kuraby was duplicated between 1950 and 1952.

With increasing popularity of the motor car, the South Coast line was closed beyond Beenleigh in 1964.

The opening of the Merivale Bridge in 1978 connected the Beenleigh (and Cleveland) line to the Brisbane CBD, and the line was electrified in 1982. The Merivale Bridge was converted to dual gauge in 1986 and standard gauge passenger trains now terminate at Roma St.

The Gold Coast line was progressively rebuilt on a new alignment south of Beenleigh from 1996. The section from Kuraby to Beenleigh was duplicated in association with the re-establishment of the Gold Coast line in 1995. The standard gauge line was converted to dual gauge and electrified at the same time, and the third line was extended from Salisbury to Kuraby in 2008.

Line guide and services
Most services stop at all stations to Roma Street railway station.  The typical travel time between Beenleigh and Brisbane City is approximately 59 minutes (to Central). From 2025 the line will utilize Cross River Rail and stop at the three new stations in the inner city.

Beenleigh line services typically continue as Ferny Grove line services.

Passengers for/from the Gold Coast line change at either South Bank, Altandi, Loganlea or Beenleigh; Cleveland line change at Park Road; Ipswich and Rosewood lines at Roma Street; and all other lines at Central.

Gallery

References

External links

Queensland Rail

Brisbane railway lines
Public transport in Brisbane
Railway lines opened in 1885
3 ft 6 in gauge railways in Australia